Matthew Thomas (born December 11, 1995) is an American soccer player who most recently played for Saint Louis FC in the USL Championship.

Career

Youth and college 
Thomas played four years of college soccer at Rocky Mountain College between 2014 and 2017, where he made 77 appearances, scoring 16 goals and tallying 10 assists.

Professional 
Thomas signed with his hometown team, the United Soccer League side Las Vegas Lights, ahead of their inaugural 2018 season. In the Lights' first match on March 17 against fellow expansion team Fresno FC, Thomas scored the first league goal in club history, just two minutes into the match. The goal proved to be the difference in Las Vegas' 3-2 win.

On June 25, 2019, Thomas moved to USL side Saint Louis FC.

References

External links 
 
 RMC Battlin' Bears profile

1995 births
Living people
American soccer players
Association football midfielders
Las Vegas Lights FC players
RMC Battlin' Bears men's soccer players
Saint Louis FC players
Soccer players from Las Vegas
Sportspeople from Las Vegas
USL Championship players